Daniel Taabu (19 January 1996) is a Kenyan rugby sevens player who represents Kenya internationally. He made his Olympic debut representing Kenya at the 2020 Summer Olympics.

Career 
He was awarded the Male Player of the Year award for the season 2017/18 by the Stanbic Mwamba club. He was the leading point scorer of the 2019 Singapore Sevens with 57 points in a tournament where Kenya finished at 13th position. During the tournament, he also scored the most number of tries for Kenya with seven. He was named in the Kenyan squad for the men's rugby sevens tournament at the 2020 Summer Olympics.

References 

  
1996 births
Living people
Kenya international rugby sevens players
Kenyan rugby sevens players
Olympic rugby sevens players of Kenya
Rugby sevens players at the 2020 Summer Olympics
Sportspeople from Nairobi
Rugby sevens players at the 2022 Commonwealth Games